Sara Errani and Nuria Llagostera Vives were the defending champions. Both were present that year, but chose to compete with different partners.Errani partnered with Lourdes Domínguez Lino, but lost in the quarterfinals to Nuria Llagostera Vives and María José Martínez Sánchez. Llagostera Vives, partnered with Martínez Sánchez, defeated Mariya Koryttseva and Darya Kustova in the final, 6–1, 6–2.

Seeds

  Anna-Lena Grönefeld /  Patty Schnyder (first round)
  Nuria Llagostera Vives /  María José Martínez Sánchez (champions)
  Ekaterina Makarova /  Galina Voskoboeva (first round)
  İpek Şenoğlu /  Yaroslava Shvedova (first round)

Draw

Draw

External links
Draw

Internazionali Femminili di Palermo - Doubles
Internazionali Femminili di Palermo